Charmed: The Book of Shadows (also known as Charmed: The Book of Shadows: Music From and Inspired By) is the second soundtrack album of the television series Charmed, which aired on The WB in the United States. It features music from the show's first seven seasons and was released on January 1, 2005, by Silva Screen Records.

Background and release
Charmed: The Book of Shadows was produced by Jonathan Platt and Jonathan Scott Miller. The soundtrack is made up mostly of tracks by little-known artists, though some better known ones, such as Dido, Vanessa Carlton, Sarah McLachlan and Ashlee Simpson, are also featured. It also includes Charmeds theme song "How Soon Is Now?" by Love Spit Love. Charmed: The Book of Shadows was released as a worldwide digital download on January 1, 2005 by Silva Screen Records. It was later released as a CD in the United States on April 19, 2005 and in the United Kingdom on September 5, 2005.

The soundtrack's cover features a small photograph of the show's Book of Shadows, which the soundtrack is named after.

Reception
Heather Phares of AllMusic gave Charmed: The Book of Shadows three stars out of five and praised the way in which the soundtrack "streamlines its approach", in comparison to the first soundtrack album, by focusing on a wide variety of female artists, echoing the theme of female empowerment raised in the television series. Whilst aware that the soundtrack has little direct tie-in with the series, Phares complemented its use of little-known artists as well as its mixture of different musical genres in creating an original approach to a television soundtrack. On May 7, 2005, Charmed: The Book of Shadows debuted at number 9 on the US Billboard Top Soundtracks chart and number 20 on the US Billboard Top Independent Albums chart.

Track listing

Charts

Release history

References

Charmed (TV series)
2005 soundtrack albums
Television soundtracks
Silva Screen Records soundtracks